Peola Branch is a stream in Reynolds County in the U.S. state of Missouri. It is a tributary of the Black River. The confluence with the Black is approximately 2.5 miles south of Lesterville.

Peola Branch most likely is a corruption of "Peoria".

See also
List of rivers of Missouri

References

Rivers of Reynolds County, Missouri
Rivers of Missouri
Tributaries of the Black River (Arkansas–Missouri)